Mouli Ganguly is an Indian Actress, who has worked in both Hindi and Bengali cinema. She shot to fame as Shaina in Ekta Kapoor's popular hit thriller series Kaahin Kissii Roz that aired from 2001–04 on Star Plus. She played the titular role in Saaksshi (2004)  She was last seen in Season 3 of Jamai Raja on Zee TV as the glamorous Payal Walia. Mouli Ganguly is nominated for the Best Actor Female for the 2002 Indian Telly Awards.

Early life
Ganguly was born in Kolkata, West Bengal and graduated in science from the University of Calcutta.

Career
She started modelling and has been in a number of TV and print ads. She has modelled for products like Pears, Rin, Ponds Face Wash, Horlicks, Rasna, Ariel, Close-Up, Pepsodent, Asian Paints, Britannia, Maggie, Saffola and Bombay Dyeing etc.

She has also worked as an assistant director before she started acting.

In April 2001, Ganguly was cast in the lead role as Shaina in Kaahin Kissii Roz. The highly rated show garnered her a lot of positive reviews. The show went on until September 2004. She later starred in Kutumb and Kkusum. In 2004, Ganguly starred in the popular Sony TV serial called Saaksshi in the lead role opposite Samir Soni and Amit Sadh.

Her television success led to an appearance in Rituporno Ghosh's critically acclaimed national award-winning movie Raincoat (2004) alongside Aishwarya Rai and Ajay Devgan. Thereafter she took a hiatus and made a comeback with Aathvaan Vachan (2008).

In 2009, she appeared on the reality dance show Nach Baliye with her then boyfriend and co-star Mazher Sayed.

She played the role of the antagonist in the serial Kya Huaa Tera Vaada which aired on Sony TV in 2012 starring as a shrewd businesswoman who rekindles a romance with a married man. In 2016, she returned as an antagonist, this time in Season 3 of Zee TV's popular Jamai Raja.

Personal life
Mouli married her longtime boyfriend, and Kaahin Kissii Roz co-star Mazher Sayed in 2010 in a private ceremony attended by close friends and family

Filmography

Films

Television

See also 

 List of Indian television actresses

References

External links

 
 

1982 births
Living people
Actresses in Bengali cinema
Participants in Indian reality television series
Actresses in Hindi cinema
Indian film actresses
Indian television actresses
Indian soap opera actresses